The Löten Church is a church located at Heidenstam Square, in Uppsala, Sweden, and is a district church of Gamla Uppsala Parish. Lötenkyrkan is one of forty partner churches that exist between the Church of Sweden and the Swedish Evangelical Mission. Hans Lindholm serves as the pastor of the Church.

Mission of the Löten Church 

The Löten Church has a mission to reach Ethiopia, serving in the hospital in Aira in western Ethiopia. Two workers from the church work as a doctor (orthopedist) and a nurse, concentrating primarily on diabetic patients.

There are others who are involved in the teaching field, like teaching Theology at EGST (Ethiopian Graduate School of Theology), English at Mekane Yesus Church Training Centre in Addis Ababa etc.

Cross Culture 

The church has a Fresh Expressions community with an international focus called "Cross Culture" led by Löten Church's youth pastor, Edward.L.Thomas. Cross Culture has drawn special attention from youth, international students from Uppsala University, immigrants, and  multicultural families in Uppsala since September 2009. 
 
This community meets every Sunday for worship at 13:30 (1:30 p.m.), which consists of worship, preaching, Sunday School, prayer and fellowship.

Reference list 

Buildings and structures in Uppsala
Churches completed in 1970
1970 establishments in Sweden
Churches in Uppsala County
Churches in the Diocese of Uppsala